Caarpsee is a lake in the Mecklenburgische Seenplatte district in Mecklenburg-Vorpommern, Germany. At an elevation of 58.8 m, its surface area is 0.412 km². It lies between the larger Woterfitzsee and the Fischteichen between Rechlin and Boek, about two kilometers east of the Müritz. The lake has a north-south extension of about 1100 meters and a west-east extension of about 300 meters.

The lake is located within the care zone of the Müritz National Park and can only be crossed from the Bolter canal to the Woterfitzsee along the concrete. Motorboats are not allowed on the Caarpsee

Lakes of Mecklenburg-Western Pomerania
LCaarpsee